Brainticket is an experimental European band most active in the early 1970s, and known for its use of exotic instruments and jazz-inspired compositions.  The only constant member was Belgian musician Joel Vandroogenbroeck until his death in 2019.  The band continued to perform concerts and release albums in the 2000s.

History
Brainticket was founded by Joel Vandroogenbroeck (born Brussels, 25 August 1938; died 23 December 2019), a Belgian who grew up studying classical piano before switching to jazz.  He received the Art Tatum prize as “youngest jazz pianist” at the age of fifteen, and toured around Europe and Africa including performances with the Quincy Jones Orchestra at the World Exhibition in Brussels and the RAI symphony of Rome.  By the late 1960s, Vandroogenbroeck was still playing jazz but he found new inspiration in German krautrock artists Amon Düül II, Can and Tangerine Dream. Under the influence of these groups, Joel and English guitarist Ron Bryer (who had previously played with The Loose Ends, The Carl Douglas Set and The Big Wheel before meeting Vandroogenbroeck in Berry Window & The Movements) recruited drummer Wolfgang Paap and formed the trio that would become Brainticket. 

The group’s 1971 debut album Cottonwoodhill featured British vocalist Dawn Muir. Cottonwoodhill immediately ran into controversy for its association with psychedelic drugs. Much to Vandroogenbroeck's disgust, the album came with a warning label that insisted you should "only listen once a day to this record. Your brain might be destroyed,” which is purported to have led to the album being banned in several countries.

Following the return to England (and subsequent death) of Bryer, Vandroogenbroeck moved to Italy and met an American woman named Carole Muriel.  Joined by a pair of Swiss musicians, guitarist Rolf Hug and bassist Martin Sacher, and percussionist Barni Palm, the group released 1972’s Psychonaut, issued at the time in Italy and Germany.  The album has been described as more accessible and song-oriented than its predecessor while still maintaining a unique and progressive sound.

A rock opera collaboration, Orfeo9, with Academy Award winning film composer Bill Conti (“Rocky”) followed before Vandroogenbroeck, Muriel and Palm began work on a new Brainticket album based on the Egyptian Book of the Dead.  The album, Celestial Ocean, told the after-life experience of Egyptian kings traveling through space and time, from the desert land to the pyramids.  Released in 1973, the album was hailed as the definitive Brainticket experience.  The band toured successfully with new band member, synthesiser player Wilhelm Seefeldt.

After returning from a trip to Bali in the mid-1970s, Vandroogenbroeck continued to collaborate with Muriel, Seefeldt and Palm.  Two more Brainticket albums followed—Adventure in 1980 and Voyage in 1982—before Vandroogenbroeck disbanded the group.   He then made a series of recordings for the German label Coloursound, who supplied ambient and mood music film and TV documentaries.  Such titles as Industrial Retrospect, Computer Blossoms, Mesopotamia Egypt and many more emerged in the late 1970s and early 1980s.  One of these sets, 1980’s science fiction themed Biomechanoid, included artwork by famed designer H.R. Giger.  Some of the albums were released anonymously, or under pseudonyms such as VDB Joel, JVDB, and Eric Vann.

1983 Brainticket reunited with Willy Seefeldt, Hans Deyssenroth and Bruno Spoerri on lyricon and synthesizers for a concert in Zurich at the symposium "Computer and Music", 1984 for concerts at Rote Fabrik Zurich and a Festival in Tübingen. In 1985, Brainticket released a cassette of a live concert in Zurich, New Age Concert, performed by Vandroogenbroeck, Seefeldt, Hans Deyssenroth, and singer Stephanie Wolff. 

Vandroogenbroeck resurrected the Brainticket name for the 2000 album Alchemic Universe with Carole Muriel and Lance Bunda.  He teamed with Cleopatra Records to release the first ever Brainticket box set, The Vintage Anthology 1971-1980, a 4-disc compilation containing the complete first three albums along with several rare recordings.

In August 2011, a newly formed Brainticket lineup, led by Vandroogenbroeck, toured with progressive-rock band Nektar, which had Brainticket performing their very first American concert on August 17, 2011, at B.B. King's in New York City.  With more interest in Brainticket’s music than ever, another tour was planned for 2013 with founding Hawkwind member Nik Turner.  Slated to accompany Vandroogenbroeck for this outing are Jürgen Engler of the German industrial band Die Krupps as well as Nicky Garratt and Jason Willer of the British punk band UK Subs.  The band was also scheduled to perform at the 2013 SXSW Festival.

Joel Vandroogenbroeck died at the age of 81 on December 23, 2019, in Guadalajara, Mexico.

Discography

Studio albums

Live albums

Compilation albums

References

External links 
[ Brainticket] at Allmusic
Brainticket's official site
Brainticket's first U.S. appearance, on YouTube
Record Collector Mag The Vintage Anthology1971-1980 
Red Bull Music Academy Interview Joel 
Allmusic - Brainticket's Psychonaut 
SXSW 2013 Music Festival Announcement 

German rock music groups
Krautrock musical groups